Bobby Batton (born March 17, 1957) is a former American football running back. He played for the New York Jets in 1980.

References

1957 births
Living people
American football running backs
UNLV Rebels football players
New York Jets players